Kincora may refer to:

 Kincora, Calgary, Canada
 Kincora, Queensland, Australia
 Kincora, Virginia, a census-designated place in Loudoun County
 Kincora Boys' Home, Belfast, Northern Ireland
 Kincora (Ceann Coradh), the birthplace of Irish King Brian Boru in modern-day Killaloe, County Clare